Zacharovce is a village and municipality in the Rimavská Sobota District of the Banská Bystrica Region of southern Slovakia. Located in the near of the main road I/50, connecting Zvolen and Košice the village is now more a living neighbourhood of Rimavská Sobota, where many citizens go for a work. The most important sightseeing is a gothic church from 15th century, later rebuilt.

References

External links
 
 
Information about Zacharovce church

Villages and municipalities in Rimavská Sobota District